Kinloss Abbey is a Cistercian abbey at Kinloss in the county of Moray, Scotland.

The abbey was founded in 1150 by King David I and was first colonised by monks from Melrose Abbey. It received its Papal Bull from Pope Alexander III in 1174, and later came under the protection of the Bishop of Moray in 1187. The abbey went on to become one of the largest and wealthiest religious houses in Scotland, receiving the valuable salmon fishing rights on the River Findhorn from Robert the Bruce in 1312, subsequently renewed by James I and James IV.

During its history the abbey has received many royal visitors, including Edward I in 1303, Edward III in 1336 and Mary, Queen of Scots, in 1562. The most renowned of the 24 abbots the monastery had was Robert Reid. Reid introduced organised education, erecting a new library and other buildings at the abbey. He became Bishop of Orkney in 1541 and, following his death, became the founder and benefactor of the University of Edinburgh with funds from his estate.  The abbey and its lands were part of the Barony of Muirton and the Lordship of Kinloss at various times.

Few of the monastic buildings remain standing today. The remains of the abbey are now situated within a graveyard owned by the local authority, and are therefore accessible at all times. They are designated a scheduled ancient monument.

See also
 Abbot of Kinloss, for a list of abbots and commendators
 List of listed buildings in Kinloss
 Scheduled monuments in Moray

References

External links
 Kinloss Abbey Trust
 

Cistercian monasteries in Scotland
Scheduled Ancient Monuments in Moray
1150 establishments in Scotland
Religious organizations established in the 1150s
Christian monasteries established in the 12th century
1601 disestablishments in Europe
Former Christian monasteries in Scotland